William Richard Thom (July 7, 1885 – August 28, 1960) was an American lawyer and politician who served three non-consecutive stints as a U.S. Representative from Ohio in the mid-19th century.

Biography 
Born in Canton, Ohio, Thom attended the public schools.
He engaged as a newspaper reporter 1905–1909.
He attended Western Reserve University, Cleveland, Ohio from 1909 to 1911.
He served as private secretary to Congressman John J. Whitacre 1911–1913.
He served as member of the United States House of Representatives Press Galleries in 1915 and 1916.
He was graduated from the law department of Georgetown University, Washington, D.C., in 1916.
He was admitted to the bar in 1917 and commenced practice in Canton, Ohio.
He served as member of the park commission of Canton 1920–1932.
He was an unsuccessful candidate for the Democratic nomination to Congress in 1920.

Congress 
Thom was elected as a Democrat to the Seventy-third, Seventy-fourth, and Seventy-fifth Congresses (March 4, 1933 – January 3, 1939).
He was an unsuccessful candidate for reelection in 1938 to the Seventy-sixth Congress.

He resumed the practice of law.

Thom was elected to the Seventy-seventh Congress (January 3, 1941 – January 3, 1943).
He was an unsuccessful candidate for reelection in 1942 to the Seventy-eighth Congress.

Thom was elected to the Seventy-ninth Congress (January 3, 1945 – January 3, 1947).
He was an unsuccessful candidate for reelection in 1946 to the Eightieth Congress.

Later career and death 
He resumed the practice of law.
He served as delegate to the 1956 Democratic National Convention.
He died in Canton, Ohio, August 28, 1960.
He was interred in West Lawn Cemetery.

Sources

1885 births
1960 deaths
Politicians from Canton, Ohio
Georgetown University Law Center alumni
Case Western Reserve University alumni
Ohio lawyers
Burials at West Lawn Cemetery
20th-century American politicians
Lawyers from Canton, Ohio
20th-century American lawyers
Democratic Party members of the United States House of Representatives from Ohio